Eisuke Tachikawa (太刀川英輔, Tachikawa Eisuke) (born 1981) is a Japanese designer.

His designs draw on traditional design such as Rinpa, but with a modern touch. Amongst his designs are with the Austrian glass manufacturer Silhouette (eyewear) in Linz. He has won a number of awards. He has also appeared on TED Tokyo.

References

External links 
 Official homepage
 World Design Organization Changemakers 2022
 Creativity Drives Society Towards Sustainability

1981 births
Japanese designers
Living people
People from Yokohama